The Focșani Gate (or ) is a militarily and strategically vulnerable area in Romania and NATO. Control of the Focșani Gate allows entry into vast tracts of Romanian territory and several other regions of Europe.

History
The area around the city of Focșani was already recognized as a weak point in Romania back in 1882. In that year, the government of Romania carried out a study to identify all the areas of the country where the terrain was not enough for defense and for engineering work to be taken on these areas to reinforce them. A few years before, Russia, a state then allied to Romania with which it had fought together in the Russo-Turkish War of 1877–1878, had stripped away the region of Southern Bessarabia from Romania, causing tensions between the two countries. Concerns over Romania's defensive capabilities arose, and the studies were performed.

The Focșani Gate saw consideration in Hypothesis Z, Romania's war plan for World War I. As Romania faced defeat from the Central Powers, the Romanian Army retreated to the Focșani Gate. Furthermore, important battles for Romania were fought in this area, including the defensive Battle of Mărășești and the offensive Battle of Mărăști, with the important defensive Third Battle of Oituz also having been fought near the Focșani Gate.

The Focșani Gate also played an important role in the Second Jassy–Kishinev offensive during World War II. It was heavily fortified by Nazi Germany-allied Romania during the Axis invasion of the Soviet Union (USSR). Despite this, on 27 August 1944, the Red Army passed through the Focșani Gate and occupied the cities of Izmail, Galați and Focșani, allowing it to spread into the directions of Bucharest, the Black Sea and the Eastern Carpathians. Romania had already withdrawn from the Axis a few days before as a result of this offensive, subsequently being occupied by the Soviet Union and having a communist regime installed.

Present times
Today, the Focșani Gate is one of the most vulnerable strategic points in NATO of which Romania is now a member. It stands as a somewhat disconnected zone because of poor infrastructure, which makes it vulnerable to a potential attack from Russia. In early 2022, serious worries existed over whether or not Russia would invade Ukraine. Such a scenario occurred on 24 February 2022. It has been theorised that a Russian incursion into Ukraine's region of Budjak would put Romania's Focșani Gate and the Danube Delta at risk, which could force Romania to occupy the region. A possible Romanian invasion of Budjak for security purposes has been discussed by other analysts as well.

See also
 Fulda Gap
 GIUK gap
 Suwałki Gap

References

Focșani
Romania and NATO
Military of Romania
Plains of Romania
Geography of Brăila County
Geography of Buzău County
Geography of Galați County
Geography of Vrancea County